László Moholy-Nagy (born László Weisz; July 20, 1895 – November 24, 1946) was a Hungarian painter and photographer as well as a professor in the Bauhaus school. He was highly influenced by constructivism and a strong advocate of the integration of technology and industry into the arts. The art critic Peter Schjeldahl called him "relentlessly experimental" because of his pioneering work in painting, drawing, photography, collage, sculpture, film, theater, and writing.

He also worked collaboratively with other artists, including his first wife Lucia Moholy, Walter Gropius, Marcel Breuer, and Herbert Bayer. His largest accomplishment may be the School of Design in Chicago, which survives today as part of the Illinois Institute of Technology, which art historian Elizabeth Siegel called "his overarching work of art". He also wrote books and articles advocating a utopian type of high modernism.

Early life and education (1895–1922)
Moholy-Nagy was born László Weisz in Bácsborsód (Hungary) to a Jewish family. His mother's second cousin was the conductor Sir Georg Solti. László was the middle child of three surviving sons, but the family was soon abandoned by the father, Lipót Weisz.

The remainder of the family took protection and support from the maternal uncle, Gusztáv Nagy. The uncle was a lawyer, and sponsored the education of László and his younger brother, Ákos. In turn, László took the Magyar surname of his mentor. Later, he added "Moholy" to his surname, after the name of the town of Mohol (now part of Serbia) where he spent part of his boyhood in the family home nearby.

László attended a gymnasium school in the city of Szeged, which was the second-largest city in the country. Initially he wanted to become a writer or poet, and in 1911 some of his poems were published in local daily newspapers. Starting in 1913, he studied law at the University of Budapest.

In 1915 during World War I, he enlisted in the Austro-Hungarian army as an artillery officer. In service, he also made crayon sketches, watercolors, and writings to document his wartime experiences. He was injured on the Russian Front in 1917, and convalesced in Budapest. While on leave and during convalescence, Moholy-Nagy became involved first with the journal Jelenkor ("The Present Age"), edited by Hevesy, and then with the "Activist" circle around Lajos Kassák’s journal Ma ("Today").

After his discharge from the military in October 1918, he abandoned his law studies and attended the private art school of the Hungarian Fauve artist Róbert Berény. In 1918, he formally converted to the Hungarian Reformed Church; his godfather was his Roman Catholic university friend, the art critic Iván Hevesy. He was a supporter of the Hungarian Soviet Republic, declared early in 1919, though he assumed no official role in it.

After the defeat of the Communist regime in August, he withdrew to Szeged. An exhibition of his work was held there, before he left for Vienna around November 1919.

Moholy-Nagy moved to Berlin early in 1920, where he met photographer and writer Lucia Schulz; they married the next year.

In 1922, at a joint exhibition with fellow Hungarian Peter Laszlo Peri at Der Sturm, he met Walter Gropius. That summer, he vacationed on the Rhone with Lucia, who introduced him to making photograms on light-sensitized paper. He also began sketching ideas for what would become his most well-known sculpture, the Light-Space Modulator.

Bauhaus years (1923–1928)

In 1923, Moholy-Nagy was invited by Walter Gropius to teach at the Bauhaus in Weimar, Germany. He took over Johannes Itten's role co-teaching the Bauhaus foundation course with Josef Albers, and also replaced Paul Klee as Head of the Metal Workshop. This effectively marked the end of the school's expressionistic leanings and moved it closer towards its original aims as a school of design and industrial integration. The Bauhaus became known for the versatility of its artists, and Moholy-Nagy was no exception. Throughout his career, he became proficient and innovative in the fields of photography, typography, sculpture, painting, printmaking, film-making, and industrial design.

One of his main focuses was photography; starting in 1922, he had been initially guided by the technical expertise of his first wife and collaborator Lucia Moholy. In his books Malerei, Photographie, Film (1925) and The New Vision, from Material to Architecture (1932), he coined the term Neues Sehen (New Vision) for his belief that the camera could create a whole new way of seeing the outside world that the human eye could not. This theory encapsulated his approach to his art and teaching.

Moholy-Nagy was the first interwar artist to suggest the use of scientific equipment such as the telescope, microscope, and radiography in the making of art. With Lucia, he experimented with the photogram; the process of exposing light-sensitive paper with objects laid upon it. His teaching practice covered a diverse range of media, including painting, sculpture, photography, photomontage, and metalworking.

Depression era (1929–1937)

Moholy-Nagy left the Bauhaus in 1928 and established his own design studio in Berlin. Marianne Brandt took over his role as Head of the Metal Workshop. He separated from his first wife Lucia in 1929.

An iconic achievement was Moholy-Nagy's construction of the Lichtrequisit einer elektrischen Bühne (Light Prop for an Electric Stage) (1928–1930), a device with moving parts designed to have light projected through it to create shifting light reflections and shadows on nearby surfaces. It was made with the help of the Hungarian architect Istvan Seboek for the Deutscher Werkbund exhibition held in Paris during the summer of 1930; it was later dubbed the Light-Space Modulator and was seen as a pioneer achievement of kinetic sculpture using industrial materials like reflective metals and Plexiglas. Given his interest in the light patterns it produced more than its appearance when viewed directly, it might more accurately be seen as one of the earliest examples of Light art. This was a form that he continued to develop in the 1940s in the United States, in Space Modulator (1939–1945), Papmac (1943), and B-10 Space Modulator (1942).

Moholy-Nagy was photography editor of the Dutch avant-garde magazine International Revue i 10 from 1927 to 1929. He designed stage sets for successful and controversial operatic and theatrical productions, designed exhibitions and books, created ad campaigns, wrote articles, and made films. His studio employed artists and designers such as Istvan Seboek, György Kepes, and Andor Weininger.

In 1931, he met actress and scriptwriter Sibylle Pietzsch. They married in 1932 and had two daughters, Hattula (born 1933), and Claudia (1936–1971). Sibyl collaborated with her husband to make Ein Lichtspiel: schwarz weiss grau ("A Lightplay: Black White Gray"), a now-classic film based on the Light-Space Modulator. She would also work with him on the films Gypsies and Berlin Still Life, and would remain with him for the rest of his life, later becoming an art and architectural historian.

After the Nazis came to power in Germany in 1933, as a foreign citizen, he was no longer allowed to work there. He worked in 1934 in the Netherlands (doing mostly commercial work) before moving with his family to London in 1935.

In England, Moholy-Nagy formed part of the circle of émigré artists and intellectuals who based themselves in Hampstead. Moholy-Nagy lived in the Isokon building with Walter Gropius for eight months and then settled in Golders Green. Gropius and Moholy-Nagy planned to establish an English version of the Bauhaus but could not secure backing, and then Moholy-Nagy was turned down for a teaching job at the Royal College of Art.

Moholy-Nagy earned a living in London by taking on various commercial design jobs, including work for Imperial Airways and a shop display for men's underwear. György Kepes worked with him on various commercial assignments.

He photographed contemporary architecture for the Architectural Review where the assistant editor was John Betjeman who commissioned Moholy-Nagy to make documentary photographs to illustrate his book An Oxford University Chest. He was commissioned to make the films Lobsters (1935) and New Architecture and the London Zoo (1936). He began to experiment with painting on transparent plastics, such as Perspex.

In 1936, he was commissioned by fellow Hungarian film producer Alexander Korda to design special effects for the now-classic film Things to Come, based on the novel by H. G. Wells. Working at Denham Studios, Moholy-Nagy created kinetic sculptures and abstract light effects, but they were mostly unused by the film's director. At the invitation of Leslie Martin, he gave a lecture to the architecture school of Hull School of Art.

In 1937 his artworks were included in the infamous "Degenerate art" exhibition held by Nazi Germany in Munich.

Chicago years (1937–1946)

In 1937, on the recommendation of Walter Gropius, and at the invitation of Walter Paepcke, the Chairman of the Container Corporation of America, Moholy-Nagy moved to Chicago to become the director of the New Bauhaus. The philosophy of the school was basically unchanged from that of the original, and its headquarters was the Prairie Avenue mansion that architect Richard Morris Hunt had designed for department store magnate Marshall Field.

However, the school lost the financial backing of its supporters after only a single academic year, and it closed in 1938. Moholy-Nagy resumed doing commercial design work, which he continued to do for the rest of his life. Moholy-Nagy was also the Art Advisor for the mail-order house of Spiegel in Chicago.

Paepcke continued to support the artist, and in 1939 Moholy-Nagy opened the School of Design in Chicago. He also started making static and mobile sculptures in transparent plastic, often accented with chromed metal.

In 1940, the summer session of the School of Design was held at Mills College in Oakland, California. In 1942, he taught a summer course at the Women's Teachers College in Denton, Texas.

In 1943, Moholy-Nagy began work on an account of his efforts to develop the curriculum of the School of Design. It would be posthumously published in his 1947 book Vision in Motion, in collaboration with his art historian wife Sibyl.

In 1944, the School of Design in Chicago became the Institute of Design, and in 1949 it would become a part of Illinois Institute of Technology, the first institution in the United States to offer a PhD in design.

Moholy-Nagy was diagnosed with leukemia in 1945. He became a naturalized American citizen in April 1946. He continued to produce artworks in multiple media, to teach, and to attend conferences until he died of the disease in Chicago on November 24, 1946. He was buried at Graceland Cemetery.

Legacy
The software company Laszlo Systems (developers of the open source programming language OpenLaszlo) was named in part to honor Moholy-Nagy. Moholy-Nagy University of Art and Design in Budapest is named in his honor. In 1998 a Tribute Marker from the City of Chicago was installed. In the autumn of 2003, the Moholy-Nagy Foundation, Inc. was established as a source of information about Moholy-Nagy's life and works. In 2016, the Solomon R. Guggenheim Museum in New York exhibited a retrospective of Moholy-Nagy's work that included painting, film, photography, and sculpture. In 2019, a documentary film The New Bauhaus directed by Alysa Nahmias was released. The film centers on Moholy-Nagy's life and legacy in Chicago, featuring his daughter Hattula Moholy-Nagy, grandsons Andreas Hug and Daniel Hug, curator Hans-Ulrich Obrist, and artists Jan Tichy, Barbara Kasten, Barbara Crane, Kenneth Josephson, Debbie Millman, and Olafur Eliasson.

Gallery

Bibliography 
 Moholy-Nagy, László. Malerei, Fotografie, Film, Munich: Albert Langen, 1925, 115 pp; 2nd ed., 1927, 140 pp.(German) PDF version: Bauhaus Bücher 8. Malerei, Fotografie, Film  (Accessed: January 12, 2017)
Moholy-Nagy, L. (1947). Vision in motion. P. Theobald.
 Moholy-Nagy, László; Hoffmann, Daphne M. (translator) (2005) The New Vision: fundamentals of Bauhaus design, painting, sculpture, and architecture. Dover, .

See also
Artificial obsolescence
Lumino kinetic art
Otto Piene – kinetic sculptor directly inspired by Moholy-Nagy's work, including Light-Space Modulator

Notes

References
 Moholy-Nagy, Lázló. Painting Photography Film. 1925. Trans. Katrin Schamun, Jillian DeMair. Zürich: Lars Müller Publishers, 2019, .
 Botar, Oliver A. I. Sensing the Future: Moholy-Nagy, die Medien und die Künste. Zürich: Lars Müller Publishers, 2014, .
 Blencowe, Chris and Judith Moholy's Edit. Zürich: Lars Müller Publishers, 2018, .
 Botar, Oliver A. I. Technical Detours: The Early Moholy-Nagy Reconsidered. New York: Art Gallery of the CUNY Graduate Center, 2006.
 Borchardt-Hume, Achim. Albers and Moholy-Nagy: From the Bauhaus to the New World. New Haven: Yale University Press, 2006.
 Chilvers, Ian & Glaves-Smith, John eds., Dictionary of Modern and Contemporary Art, Oxford: Oxford University Press, 2009.
 Engelbrecht, Lloyd C. Moholy-Nagy: Mentor to Modernism. Cincinnati, Flying Trapeze Press, 2009.
 Hight, Eleanor. Picturing Modernity: Moholy-Nagy and Photography in Weimar Germany. Cambridge, Massachusetts: MIT Press, 1995.
 Lusk, Irene-Charlotte. Montagen ins Blaue: Laszlo Moholy-Nagy, Fotomontagen und -collagen 1922–1943. Gießen: Anabas, 1980.
 Margolin, Victor. The Struggle for Utopia: Rodchenko, Lissitzky, Moholy-Nagy, 1917–1946. Chicago: University of Chicago Press, 1997.
 Moholy-Nagy, Lázló. Painting Photography Film. 1925. Trans. Janet Seligman. Cambridge, Massachusetts: MIT Press, 1973.
 Passuth, Krisztina. Moholy-Nagy. Trans. London: Thames and Hudson, 1985.

External links

 The Moholy-Nagy Foundation
 A Memory of Moholy-Nagy
 Biography of Moholy-Nagy
Institute of Design web site (Chicago), founded by Moholy-Nagy as 'New Bauhaus in 1937
 Long 2006 article in The Guardian on Moholy-Nagy
 Moholy-Nagy and the Photogram
 Lightplay:Black White Gray
 Moholy-Nagy examples of work for London Transport 
 László Moholy-Nagy. Photograms 1922–1943 Exhibition at Fundació Antoni Tàpies

1895 births
1946 deaths
Abstract painters
People from Bács-Kiskun County
Hungarian Jews
Hungarian Calvinist and Reformed Christians
Hungarian painters
Hungarian photographers
Jewish painters
Modern painters
Academic staff of the Bauhaus
Illinois Institute of Technology faculty
Design educators
Architecture educators
Burials at Graceland Cemetery (Chicago)
Hungarian graphic designers
Converts to Calvinism from Judaism
Deaths from leukemia
Hungarian emigrants to the United States